Sandra Ceccarelli (born 3 July 1967) is an Italian film actress.

Daughter of Franco Ceccarelli, guitarist of the 1960s and 1970s Italian rock group Equipe 84, and Sandra von Glasersfeld (daughter of philosopher Ernst von Glasersfeld), Ceccarelli had her film debut at the age of sixteen in Giuseppe Bertolucci's 1985 film Segreti segreti.

Between 1995 and 1997 she studied acting with Carlos Alsina and Giorgio Albertazzi. After spending several years in theatre, she returned to film in 2001 starring in Ermanno Olmi's film The Profession of Arms and Giuseppe Piccioni's Light of My Eyes, for which she won the Volpi Cup for Best Actress at the 2001 Venice Film Festival.

She also starred in Piccioni's 2004 film The Life I Want, which won her a second nomination for the David di Donatello for Best Actress award (the Italian equivalent of the Academy Award), and a nomination for the 2005 European Film Award for Best Actress (which she lost to Germany's Julia Jentsch).

She also appeared in the 2006 Austrian biopic Klimt about the painter Gustav Klimt and the 2006 Croatian film Libertas about the Renaissance playwright Marin Držić.

Selected filmography

References

External links

1967 births
Living people
20th-century Italian actresses
21st-century Italian actresses
Actresses from Milan
Italian film actresses
Italian people of German descent
Nastro d'Argento winners
Volpi Cup for Best Actress winners